Mamadou Diop (born 26 March 1955) is a former Senegalese basketball player with AS Forces Armées. Diop competed for Senegal at the 1980 Summer Olympics, where he scored 29 points in 6 games.

References

1955 births
Living people
Senegalese men's basketball players
1978 FIBA World Championship players
Olympic basketball players of Senegal
Basketball players at the 1980 Summer Olympics